Anthony Peluso (born April 18, 1989) is a Canadian professional ice hockey player who is currently an unrestricted free agent. Peluso was selected by the St. Louis Blues in the 6th round (160th overall) of the 2007 NHL Entry Draft. Peluso was born in North York, Ontario.

Playing career
Prior to turning professional, Peluso played major junior hockey in the Ontario Hockey League with the Erie Otters, Sault Ste. Marie Greyhounds and the Brampton Battalion. He was drafted by the Otters 10th overall in the 2005 OHL draft. In November 2007, Peluso was traded to the Sault Ste. Marie Greyhounds in exchange for Sean Jones, a 4th round pick in the 2008 OHL draft and a 3rd round pick in the 2009 OHL draft. He was traded to the Brampton Battalion in January 2009 where he ended his major junior career. On March 12, 2009, the St. Louis Blues signed Peluso to a three-year entry-level contract.

On December 15, 2013, Peluso was suspended three games for boarding Dallas Stars defenseman Alex Goligoski. Prior to the shortened 2012–13 lock-out season, Peluso was claimed off waivers from the Blues by the Winnipeg Jets on January 16, 2013. On July 22, 2013, the Jets signed Peluso who was an RFA to a two-year extension worth $1.125-million.  Peluso scored his first NHL goal on October 24, 2013 against Carter Hutton of the Nashville Predators. On June 17, 2015, the Jets resigned Peluso to a two-year extension, worth $1.35 million.

After five seasons within the Jets organization, Peluso left as a free agent to sign a one-year, two-way contract with the Washington Capitals on July 1, 2017. He was sent to their AHL affiliate, the Hershey Bears, but after playing three games for them was recalled back to the NHL. He made two appearances for the Capitals, before completing the season with the Bears, registering 11 points in 38 games.

On August 21, 2018, Peluso signed a one-year, two-way contract with the Calgary Flames. He was assigned to their AHL affiliate, the Stockton Heat, prior to the 2018–19 season but was recalled to the NHL on October 6.

As a free agent from the Flames, Peluso was unable to garner an NHL contract, opting to sign a one-year AHL contract with the Bakersfield Condors, affiliate to the Edmonton Oilers, on July 17, 2019.

Personal
Peluso and his wife Courtney have one son together, born in 2018.

Career statistics

References

External links

1989 births
Living people
Alaska Aces (ECHL) players
Bakersfield Condors players
Bloomington PrairieThunder players
Brampton Battalion players
Calgary Flames players
Canadian ice hockey right wingers
Erie Otters players
Hershey Bears players
Manitoba Moose players
Peoria Rivermen (AHL) players
St. Louis Blues draft picks
Sault Ste. Marie Greyhounds players
HC Slovan Bratislava players
Sportspeople from North York
Ice hockey people from Toronto
Stockton Heat players
Washington Capitals players
Winnipeg Jets players
Canadian expatriate ice hockey players in Slovakia
Canadian expatriate ice hockey players in the United States